Rodrigo Pacheco may refer to:
 Rodrigo Pacheco (badminton), Peruvian badminton player
 Rodrigo Pacheco (politician), Brazilian politician and lawyer
 Rodrigo Pacheco (footballer), Myanmar-Argentine footballer
 Rodrigo Pacheco, 3rd Marquess of Cerralvo, Spanish nobleman